The Pre-Pyrenees are the foothills of the Pyrenees.

Description
As a mountainous system the Pre-Pyrenees are part of the Pyrenees. They run parallel to the main mountain range in a west to east direction. 

On the French side the Pyrenees's slopes descend rather abruptly, thus on the northern side, the Pre-Pyrenees are confined to the Corbières Massif, towards the eastern end of the mountain system. The Massif de Plantaurel further west deserves mention as well, although not as clearly a foothill.

On the Iberian side, however, the picture is very different: a large and complex system of foothill ranges stretches from Navarre, across northern Aragon, reaching the Mediterranean coast on the Catalan end of the Pyrenees. At the eastern end on the southern side lies a distinct area known as the Sub-Pyrenees.

Main ranges

Northern slope
Corbières Massif
Massif de Plantaurel

Southern slope
The main ranges are:

In Catalonia
Serra d'Aubenç
Serra dels Bastets
Serra de Bellmunt
Cingles de Beví
Serra de Boumort
Serra de Busa
Serra del Cadí
Montsec de Tost
Serra de Boumort
Serra de Camporan
Serra de les Canals
Serra de Capsacosta
Serra de Malforat
Serra de la Cau
Serra de Carreu
El Catllaràs
Serra de Comiols
Serra del Port del Comte
Serra de Querol
Serra del Verd
Serra de Conivella
Serrat de la Creueta
Serra d'Ensija
La Faiada de Malpàs
Serra de Falgars
Serra de la Gessa
Serra de Sant Mamet
Serra de Moixeró
Serra de Milany
Mare de Déu del Mont
Serra de Monebui
Serra de Montclús
Montsec range
Montsec de Rúbies, the eastern massif, is separated by the river Segre in the east and the Noguera Pallaresa in the middle.
Serra del Cucuc
Montsec d'Ares, the central massif. 
Montrebei
Montsec d'Estall, in Aragon, located to the west, separated by the Noguera Ribagorçana from the central massif.
Serra de Montgrony
Serra de Prada
Serra de Picamill
Serra de Picancel
Serra de Queralt
Serra de Sant Gervàs
Serra de Setcomelles
Serra de Sant Joan
Serra de Sant Marc
Serra de serra de Sobremunt
Serra del Volterol
Serra dels Tossals
Serra de Turp
Rasos de Peguera
Serrat de la Figuerassa
In Aragon
Sierra Caballera
Sierra del Castillo de Llaguarres
Sierra de la Carrodilla
Cotiella
Serra d'Esdolomada
Sierra Ferrera
Sierra de Giró
Serra del Jordal
Sierra de las Ares
Sierra de Guara
El Turbón
Sierra de Sis
Sierra de Santo Domingo
Sierra de Loarre
Sierra de Javierre
Sierra Caballera
In Navarre
Sierra de Leire

Features

See also
Geology of the Pyrenees
Sub-Pyrenees
List of mountains in Catalonia
List of mountains in Aragon

References

External links

 
Mountain ranges of Catalonia
Mountain ranges of Aragon
Mountain ranges of Navarre
Mountain ranges of Occitania (administrative region)